The 2016 Men's EuroHockey Indoor Championship was the eighteenth edition of the Men's EuroHockey Indoor Championship, the biennial international men's indoor hockey championship of Europe organized by the European Hockey Federation. It took place from 15 to 17 January 2016 in Prague, Czech Republic.

The two-time defending champions Germany won their 15th title by defeating Austria 3–2 in the final. Russia won the bronze medal by defeating the hosts the Czech Republic 4–3.

Qualified teams

Results
All times are local (UTC+1).

Preliminary round

Pool A

Pool B

Fifth to eighth place classification

Pool C
The points obtained in the preliminary round against the other team are taken over.

First to fourth place classification

Semi-finals

Third place game

Final

Final standings

References

Men's EuroHockey Indoor Championship
EuroHockey Indoor Nations Championship Men
Sports competitions in Prague
International indoor hockey competitions hosted by the Czech Republic
EuroHockey Indoor Nations Championship Men
EuroHockey Indoor Nations Championship Men
Men 1